Provincial deputation can refer to:

 Provincial deputation (Spain)
 Provincial deputation in Spanish America